Marcel Maupi, stage name of Marcel Louis Alexandre Barberin or Maupi, (6 November 1881, Marseille – 4 January 1949, Antibes) was a French actor.

Selected filmography
 Dance Hall (1931)
 Marius (1931)
 Fanny (1932)
 The Ironmaster (1933)
 The Weaker Sex (1933)
 Roger la Honte (1933)
 La dame de chez Maxim's (1933)
 The Typist Gets Married (1934)
 Ferdinand le noceur (1935)
 César (1936)
 Forty Little Mothers (1936)
 The Brighton Twins (1936)
 The Kings of Sport (1937)
 The Baker's Wife (1938)
 Rail Pirates (1938)
  The Strange Monsieur Victor (1938)
 Berlingot and Company (1939)
 Angelica (1939)
 Camp Thirteen (1940)
 President Haudecoeur (1940)
 First Ball (1941)
 The Last of the Six (1941)
 The Benefactor (1942)
 Malaria (1943)
 Voyage Without Hope (1943)
 Happy Go Luck (1946)
 The Marriage of Ramuntcho (1947)
 Two Loves (1949)

References

External links

1881 births
1949 deaths
French male film actors
French male silent film actors
Male actors from Marseille
20th-century French male actors